The Vividness of Visual Imagery Questionnaire (VVIQ) was developed in 1973 by the British psychologist David Marks (Marks, 1973). The VVIQ consists of 16 items in four groups of 4 items in which the participant is invited to consider the mental image formed in thinking about specific scenes and situations. The vividness of the image is rated along a 5-point scale. The questionnaire has been widely used as a measure of individual differences in vividness of visual imagery. The large body of evidence confirms that the VVIQ is a valid and reliable psychometric measure of visual image vividness.

In 1995 Marks published a new version of the VVIQ, the VVIQ2 (Marks, 1995). This questionnaire consists of twice the number of items and reverses the rating scale so that higher scores reflect higher vividness.  Campos and Pérez-Fabello (2009) evaluated the reliability and construct validity of the VVIQ and the VVIQ2. Cronbach's  reliabilities for both the VVIQ and the VVIQ-2 were found to be high. Estimates of internal consistency reliability and construct validity were found to be similar for the two versions.

Validation
The VVIQ has proved an essential tool in the scientific investigation of mental imagery as a phenomenological, behavioral and neurological construct. Marks' (1973) paper has been cited in close to 2000 studies of mental imagery in a variety of fields including cognitive psychology, clinical psychology and neuropsychology.

The procedure can be carried out with eyes closed and/or with eyes open. Total score on the VVIQ is a predictor of the person's performance in a variety of cognitive, motor, and creative tasks. For example, Marks (1973) reported that high vividness scores correlate with the accuracy of recall of coloured photographs.

The VVIQ is in several languages apart from English including Spanish (Campos, González and Amor, 2002), French (Denis, 1982), Japanese (Hishitani, 2005) and Polish (Jankowska and Karwowski, 2020). Factor analysis of the Spanish VVIQ by Campos, González, and Amor (2002) indicated a single factor that explained 37% of the variance with good internal consistency (Cronbach α = 88).

The VVIQ has spawned imagery vividness questionnaires across several other modalities including auditory (VAIQ; Brett and Starker, 1977), movement (VMIQ; Isaac, Marks and Russell, 1986), olfactory(VOIQ; Gilbert, Crouch and Kemp, 1998) and wine imagery (VWIQ; Croijmans, Speed, Arshamian and Majid, 2019).

Some critics have argued that introspective or ‘self-report’ questionnaires including the VVIQ are “too subjective” and can fall under the influence of social desirability, demand characteristics and other uncontrolled factors (Kaufmann, 198). In spite of this issue, acceptably strong evidence of criterion validity for the VVIQ has been found in meta analysis of more than 200 studies. The meta analysis by McKelvie (1995) indicated that internal consistency and test-retest reliability of the VVIQ were acceptable and minimally acceptable respectively, while alternate form reliability was unacceptable. McKelvie (1995) reported only a weak correlation (r =.137) between VVIQ imagery ability and memory performance. However, McKelvie (1995, p. 59) asserted that his “findings support the construct of vividness and the validity of the VVIQ”. McKelvie’s meta analysis (1995, p. 81) obtained an acceptable relationship between the VVIQ and criterion test performance with the strongest relationship with self-report tasks.

A meta analysis of gender differences in 16 comparisons of men and women’s VVIQ scores showed a “slight but reliable tendency for women to report more vivid images than men” (Richardson (1995). However, Richardson observed that “randomizing the order of the items abolishes the gender differences suggesting that the latter are “determined by psychosocial factors rather than by biological ones” (p.177). 

Rodway, Gillies and Schepman (2006) used a novel long-term change detection task to determine whether participants with low and high vividness scores on the VVIQ2 showed any performance differences.  Rodway et al. (2006) found that high vividness participants were significantly more accurate at detecting salient changes to pictures compared to low vividness participants. This replicated an earlier study by Gur and Hilgard (1975).

An unresolved issue about image vividness ratings concerns whether the ratings are measures of a “trait”, a “state” or a mixture of the two. An updated meta analysis of the validity of the VVIQ by Runge, Cheung  and D’Angiulli (2017) compared two main formats used to measure imagery vividness: trial-by-trial vividness ratings (VRs) and the Vividness of Visual Imagery Questionnaire (VVIQ). The associations between the vividness scores obtained using these two formats and all existing behavioural, cognitive and neuroscientific measures were computed.  Significantly larger effect sizes were found for VR than for VVIQ, which suggest that VRs provide a more reliable self-report measure than the VVIQ, and “may reflect a more direct route of reportability than the latter”.

Neuropsychological Studies

Recent studies have found that individual differences in VVIQ scores can be used to predict changes in a person's brain while visualizing different activities.  Unlike associations between cognitive or perceptual performance measures and VVIQ scores, demand characteristics and social desirability effects can be eliminated as possible explanations of any observed differences between vivid and non-vivid images.

Marks and Issac (1995) mapped electroencephalographic (EEG) activity topographically during visual and motor imagery in vivid and non-vivid imagers. Topographical maps of EEG activation revealed attenuation of alpha power in vivid images during visual imagery, particularly in the left posterior quadrant of the cortex, but enhanced alpha power during motor imagery.

Amedi, Malach and Pascual-Leone (2005) predicted that VVIQ scores might be correlated with the degree of deactivation of the auditory cortex in individual subjects in functional magnetic resonance imaging (fMRI). These investigators found a significant positive correlation between the magnitude of A1 deactivation (negative blood-oxygen-level-dependent -BOLD- signal in auditory cortex) and the subjective vividness of visual imagery (Spearman r = 0.73, p < 0.05). In a related study, Xu Cui, Cameron Jeter, Dongni Yang, Read Montague and David Eagleman (2007) also observed that reported vividness is correlated with an objective measure of brain activity: the early visual cortex activity relative to the whole brain activity measured by fMRI. These results show that individual differences in the visual imagery vividness are quantifiable even in the absence of subjective report.

In a meta analysis, Runge, Cheung  and D’Angiulli (2017) observed that both VR and VVIQ “are more strongly associated with the neural, than the cognitive and behavioural correlates of imagery. If one establishes neuroscience measures as the criterion variable, then self-reports of vividness show higher construct validity than behavioural/cognitive measures of imagery”.  

In a large study with 285 participants, Tabi, Maio, Attaallah, et al. (2022) investigated the association between VVIQ scores, visual short-term memory performance and volumes of brain structures including the hippocampus, amygdala, primary motor cortex, primary visual cortex and the fusiform gyrus. Tabi et al. (2022) used a variant of the “What was where?” visual object-location binding task to assess the participants’ memories over 1- or 4-second delays. In healthy volunteers, there was no evidence of an association between the vividness of visual imagery and short term memory. However, significant positive correlations occurred between visual imagery and the volumes of the hippocampus and primary visual cortex.

The figure shows VVIQ correlations with Bilateral Hippocampal Volume, Amygdala Volume, Volume of the Primary Motor Cortex, of the Primary Visual Cortex and of the Fusiform Gyrus. Vividness of Visual Imagery Questionnaire (VVIQ) Scores positively correlated with the volume of the Hippocampus and the Primary Visual Cortex but not with the volume of the Amygdala or the Primary Motor Cortex controls, suggesting an involvement of these two areas in visual imagery and confirming our second hypothesis. There was, however, no correlation of Fusiform gyrus volume and VVIQ (Tabi, et al., 2022).

The neuropsychological evidence indicates that people who are high vs. low VVIQ scorers have associated cortical volumes in structures thought to be responsible for image generation.

References

Sources
Amedi, A., Malach, R. & Pascual-Leone, A. (2005). "Negative BOLD Differentiates Visual Imagery and Perception". Neuron, 48, 859–872. 
Brett, E. A., & Starker, S. (1977). “Auditory imagery and hallucinations”. Journal of Nervous and Mental Disease, 164(6), 394–400. 
Campos, A., Lopez, A., & Perez, M. J. (1998). “Vividness of visual and haptic imagery of movement”. Perceptual and Motor Skills, 87(1), 271-274.
Campos A., González, M.A., & Amor, A. (2002).”The Spanish Version of the Vividness of Visual Imagery Questionnaire: Factor Structure and Internal Consistency Reliability”. Psychological Reports, 90(2):503-506. 
Campos, A. & Pérez-Fabello, M.J. (2009). "Psychometric quality of a revised version Vividness of Visual Imagery Questionnaire". Perceptual & Motor Skills, 108, 798–802.
Croijmans, I., Speed, L. J., Arshamian, A., & Majid, A. (2019). “Measuring multisensory imagery of wine: The vividness of wine imagery questionnaire”. Multisensory Research, 32(3), 179-195.
 Cui, X., Jeter, C.B., Yang, D., Montague, P.R., & Eagleman, D.M. (2007). "Vividness of mental imagery: Individual variability can be measured objectively". Vision Research, 47, 474–478.
Gur, R.C. & Hilgard, E.R. (1975). "Visual imagery and discrimination of differences between altered pictures simultaneously and successively presented". British Journal of Psychology, 66, 341–345.
Gilbert, A. N., Crouch, M., & Kemp, S. E. (1998). "Olfactory and visual mental imagery". Journal of Mental Imagery, 22(3-4), 137–146.
Hishitani, S. (2005). “The measurement of imagery ability”. In S. Hishitani & T. Tayama(Eds.), The measurement of mind. Tokyo: Yachiyo Shuppan, pp. 140–141. (In Japanese.)
Isaac, A., Marks, D. F., & Russell, D. G. (1986). “An instrument for assessing imagery of movement: The Vividness of Movement Imagery Questionnaire (VMIQ)”. Journal of Mental Imagery, 10, 23-30.
Jankowska, D., & Karwowski, M. (2020, September 22). “Mental imagery and creativity”. https://doi.org/10.31234/osf.io/eyfxr
Kaufmann, G. (1981). “What is wrong with imagery questionnaires?”. Scandinavian Journal of Psychology, 22(1), 59-64.
 Lee, S-H., Kravitz, D.J., &  Baker, C. I. (2012). “Disentangling visual imagery and perception of real-world objects”. NeuroImage, 59, 4064–4073.
Logie, R.H., Pernet, C.R.,  Buonocore, A., & Della Sala, S. (2011). "Low and high imagers activate networks differentially in mental rotation". Neuropsychologia, 49, 3071–3077.
Marks, D.F.  (1973). "Visual imagery differences in the recall of pictures". British Journal of Psychology, 64, 17–24.
Marks, D.F. (1995). "New directions for mental imagery research". Journal of Mental Imagery, 19, 153–167.
Marks, D. F., & Isaac, A. R. (1995). “Topographical distribution of EEG activity accompanying visual and motor imagery in vivid and non‐vivid imagers”. British Journal of Psychology, 86(2), 271-282.
McKelvie, S. J. (1995). “The VVIQ as a psychometric test of individual differences in visual imagery performance: A critical quantitative summary and plea for direction”. Journal of Mental Imagery, 19, 1-106.
Richardson, J. T. E. (1995). “Gender differences in the Vividness of Visual Imagery Questionnaire: A Meta-analysis”. Journal of Mental Imagery, 19(3-4), 177–187.
Rodway, P., Gillies, K. & Schepman, A. (2006). "Vivid imagers are better at detecting salient changes". Journal of Individual Differences, 27, 218–228.
Runge, M.S.,Cheung,M W-L., D’Angiulli, A. (2017). “Meta-analytic comparison of trial- versus questionnaire-based vividness reportability across behavioral, cognitive and neural measurements of imagery”. Neuroscience of Consciousness, 2017 (1) nix006. 
    Text was copied from this source, which is available under a  Creative Commons Attribution 4.0 International License.

External Links 

 The Vividness of Visual Imagery Questionnaire at Aphantasia Network

Cognition